Alexandros Nikolopoulos may refer to:

 Alexandros Nikolopoulos (pentathlete) (born 1970), Greek modern pentathlete
 Alexandros Nikolopoulos (weightlifter) (born 1875), Greek weightlifter